The Rajiv Chowk is a Delhi Metro station in Delhi, on the Blue and Yellow Lines. It is a transfer station between the Blue Line on the upper level and the Yellow Line on the lower level.

It is one of the busiest stations on the network, serving Rajiv Chowk in the heart of Delhi. It handles 5 lakh passengers every day.

Many businesses and important buildings, restaurants, and cinemas are situated just outside the station. The station is constructed below Central Park.
Connaught Place is officially known as Rajiv Chowk, formerly known as Connaught Circus. In September 1995, the Home Ministry decreed that henceforth, the 75-year-old Connaught Place (CP) will be known as Rajiv Chowk and Connaught Circus as Indira Chowk.

Entry/Exit

See also
Chennai Central metro station
Kashmere Gate metro station

References

External links

 Delhi Metro Rail Corporation Ltd. (Official site) 
 Delhi Metro Annual Reports
 

Delhi Metro stations
Railway stations opened in 2005
2005 establishments in Delhi
Railway stations in New Delhi district